Tony Dean (second ¼ 1949 – 18 July 2014) was an English professional rugby league footballer who played in the 1960s, 1970s and 1980s, and coached in the 1980s.

Background
Tony Dean's birth was registered in Pontefract, West Riding of Yorkshire, England, he died aged 65 of cancer in Prince of Wales hospice, Pontefract, West Yorkshire, his funeral service took place at St Cuthbert's Church, Cross Hill, Ackworth at 1pm on Friday 1 August 2014, followed by a reception at The Frog and Moose, Wakefield Road, Ackworth.

Playing career

Challenge Cup Final appearances
Tony Dean played  (Kevin Harkin having played in the first match) in Hull FC's 18-9 victory over Widnes in the 1982 Challenge Cup Final replay during the 1981–82 season at Elland Road, Leeds on Wednesday 19 May 1982, in front of a crowd of 41,171.

County Cup Final appearances
Tony Dean played  in Hull FC's 13-2 victory over Castleford in the 1983 Yorkshire County Cup Final during the 1983–84 season at Elland Road, Leeds on Saturday 15 October 1983.

John Player Trophy Final appearances
Tony Dean played  (replaced by interchange/substitute Kevin Harkin), and scored a drop goal in Hull FC's 12-4 victory over Hull Kingston Rovers in the 1981–82 John Player Trophy Final during the 1981–82 season at Headingley Rugby Stadium, Leeds on Saturday 23 January 1982.

Playing career
Tony Dean was the coach of Wakefield Trinity from June 1986 to December 1986, and he was the coach of Hull F.C. (Joint Head Coach with Keith Hepworth) during 1988.

Genealogical information
Tony Dean's marriage to Doreen (née Dickinson) was registered during first ¼ 1967 in Pontefract district. They had three sons; Paul Derrick Dean (birth registered third ¼  in Pontefract district), Philip Russell Dean (birth registered second ¼  in Pontefract district), and Lee Dean (born ), and three grandsons; Ben, Jack, and Sam.

References

External links
 (archived by web.archive.org) Past Players → D at hullfc.com
 (archived by web.archive.org) Statistics at hullfc.com

1949 births
2014 deaths
Batley Bulldogs players
Castleford Tigers players
English rugby league coaches
English rugby league players
Hull F.C. coaches
Hull F.C. players
Hunslet R.L.F.C. players
Rugby league halfbacks
Rugby league locks
Rugby league players from Pontefract
Wakefield Trinity coaches